The Copa del Generalísimo 1954 Final was the 52nd final of the King's Cup. The final was played at Estadio Chamartín in Madrid, on 20 June 1954, being won by Valencia CF, who beat CF Barcelona 3-0.

Details

References

1954
Copa
FC Barcelona matches
Valencia CF matches